Mystery in Swing is an American murder mystery film released in 1940. It was directed by Arthur Dreifuss, based on a script by Arthur Hoerl. (The University of California at Berkeley erroneously states it was directed by Arthur Hoerl.)

Mystery in Swing features music by The Four Toppers and Cee Pee Johnson and his Orchestra and was noted as being the first time a Black orchestra recorded an entire score for a film. It is currently held in the collections of the National Museum of African American History and Culture.

Synopsis 
The movie's plot features the murder of an unpopular band leader at a nightclub and a long list of suspects.

Songs in the movie include "Jump, the water's fine", "Let's go to a party" performed by The Four Toppers, "You can't fool yourself about love", "Beat my blues away", and "Swinging sweet and lightly" performed by Cee Pee Johnson and his Orchestra.

Cast 
Monte Hawley as Biff Boyd
Marguerite Whitten as Linda Carroll
Tommie Moore as Mae Carroll
Edward Thompson as Captain Hall
Buck Woods as Buck Bedford
Jess Lee Brooks as John Carroll
Josephine Edwards as Maxine Ray
Sybil Lewis as Cleo Ellis
Robert Webb (actor) as Prince Ellis
Alfred Grant as Chet Wallace
Thomas Southern as Sgt. Phipps
Halley Harding as Editor Bailey

Reception and legacy 
A review in Box Office noted, "The cast, largely comprising night-club entertainers, delivers competently and there are a few welcome and well-done musical interludes." Mystery in Swing has been noted for being the first time a Black orchestra recorded an entire score for a film.

The Pittsburgh Courier ran a story on the film as it was in production.

References

External links
 
 

1940 mystery films
1940 films
American mystery films
African-American films
American black-and-white films
Race films
Films directed by Arthur Dreifuss
1940s American films